Kirk Pengilly (born 4 July 1958) is an Australian musician and member of the Australian rock group INXS. Kirk plays saxophone, guitar and also performs as a backing vocalist.

Early career
Pengilly moved to Sydney in 1966, and became best friends with fellow band member Tim Farriss with whom he attended Forest High School.

Their first band Guinness, formed in 1971, was a high school band in which Pengilly was the principal songwriter and lead singer. The band included American David Stewart on pedal-steel guitar and Malcolm Walker on drums, and was named after bass player Steve Spencer's dog. Guinness played a style of music inspired by bands like Yes, Pink Floyd, Emerson Lake and Palmer and Gentle Giant on one hand, and country rockers like Bruce Springsteen and Jimmy Buffett on the other.  Mixing country rock and the concert style of rock music worked well for a while, and the band enjoyed some success on Sydney's Northern Beaches and Sydney city venues like Chequers, Frenchs and others.  But the music was not really commercial and the band struggled to gain a steady following. In late 1976, the group disbanded when David Stewart returned to America. Malcolm played in the club scene with a number of bands, while Steven embarked upon a career as a sound technician in the UK.

INXS

The Farriss Brothers band was formed in 1977, subsequently changing the band name to INXS in 1979.

As principal backing vocalist, saxophonist and guitarist, Pengilly contributes to the music that INXS release. He has written, produced and performed b-sides. Pengilly was also the creator of the rare Happy Christmas record sent to early 1980s fanclub members in Australia and the United States. His main instrument though is the guitar. "My eldest brother, Mark, gave me a beat up acoustic guitar when I was about nine and I taught myself playing along to records," Pengilly recalls.

INXS have toured the world with highlights including playing to 250,000 people at the US Festival in California in 1983, with Queen at Wembley Stadium in 1986, headlining the huge HFS-Tival, performing for Prince Charles and Princess Diana in Melbourne 1985, headlining the Rock 'n Rio Festival where they played to over 150,000 people and their own sell out show to 75,000 people at Wembley Stadium. The band's awards include three American Grammy nominations and have been inducted into the Australian ARIA "Hall of Fame.".

His position also sees him as the key publicity spokesperson, a role he does not take lightly. Pengilly is also the band's archivist, faithfully logging daily entries in diaries that date back to the beginning of INXS.

Pengilly stated that Michael Hutchence's death in 1997 came as a big shock because Hutchence was in "a great place" and believes it was an accident. After Hutchence's death the band continued playing with various different singers until the band parted ways in 2012.

After 430 weeks in the ARIA top 100 albums chart, INXS's album "The Very Best" reached Diamond status in 2020.

Other projects
In 1982 Pengilly became involved in a one-off EP project with the band, The Igniters. The following year he, Andrew Farriss, and Garry Gary Beers worked together on the 12" release of "Flaming Hands" / "Cast My Love".  In 1987 Pengilly appeared in the music video "You're Gonna Get Hurt", released by Australian singer Jenny Morris, unrecognizable without his trademark glasses.

When the band was on a break during 1989, Pengilly along with Tim Farriss produced an album for local Sydney band Crash Politics. He played saxophone for Richard Clapton on his Distant Thunder album in 1993, and has also been a session guitarist for Shona Laing and saxophonist for Martin Plaza.  His production efforts include an album for his brother Drew's band, Coo, in 1999, and in 2002 Pengilly co-wrote and co-produced the album "Still in Bed" by Hughie Murray.

Pengilly starred in the first series of Celebrity MasterChef Australia and progressed to the finals, where he came second to Olympic swimmer Eamon Sullivan.

In December 2016 Pengilly and his wife Layne became Brand Ambassadors for the online health and wellness market-place Inner Origin.

Personal life

Pengilly has one daughter, April Rose Pengilly (who is an actress), born in 1988, with his ex-girlfriend Karen Hutchinson. Hutchinson and Pengilly were together for ten years, in which time she toured with the band. In December 1993, Pengilly married singer Deni Hines. The marriage lasted ten months, and the two parted ways in early 1995.

Pengilly is married to seven time world women's champion pro surfer, Layne Beachley. Their relationship started after a very awkward first date set up by mutual friend Jon Stevens. The pair had no connection, until they were joined on their date by the restaurant owner, who shared a bottle of Limoncello, and the spark began. After a 7-year courtship, they were married at their South Coast home in New South Wales in a private ceremony at 10:10am on 10 October 2010. They renewed their wedding vows in 2014 after Layne lost her wedding ring whilst surfing. In 2020, they celebrated their 10-year wedding anniversary with a trip to the Blue Mountains and stated that the pandemic lockdown helped to bring them closer together. Pengilly and Beachley currently live on the northern beaches of Sydney.

Pengilly is an ambassador of Glaucoma Australia, after experiencing glaucoma in 1987 at the age of 29. Pengilly underwent surgery for aggressive prostate cancer in 2015 after indications of the condition started in 2012.

Pengilly plays a SG1820 Yamaha guitar after being influenced by hearing Carlos Santana playing one.

References

External links

Incomplete list songs composed by Kirk Pengilly (ASCAP)
Incomplete list songs composed by Kirk Pengilly (BMI)

1958 births
Living people
Australian rock guitarists
Australian saxophonists
Male saxophonists
INXS members
Australian people of Cornish descent
MasterChef Australia
Rock saxophonists
20th-century Australian musicians
21st-century Australian musicians
People from the North Shore, Sydney
21st-century saxophonists
Australian male guitarists
Musicians from Sydney